The Chornobaivka rural hromada is an amalgamated hromada in Ukraine, in Kherson Raion  of Kherson Oblast. Its administrative center is Chornobaivka. Population:

Settlements 
The hromada contains 9 settlements: Barvinok, Blahodatne, Zelenyi Hai, Kyselivka, Posad-Pokrovske, Soldatske, Chornobaivka (seat of the hromada), and one village  — .

History 
During the 2022 Russian invasion of Ukraine, the Chornobaivka rural hromada was included within the list of amalgamated hromadas of Ukraine the inhabitants of which could seek support from the state due to being either under Russian military occupation or to being within fighting zone.

References 

 
2017 establishments in Ukraine
Hromadas of Kherson Oblast